Sunshine Coast Lightning are an Australian netball team based at the University of the Sunshine Coast. The team was formed in 2016 as a joint venture between the university and Melbourne Storm. Since 2017 they have played in Suncorp Super Netball. Lightning have played in three grand finals, winning premierships in 2017 and 2018.

History

New franchise

In May 2016, Netball Australia and Netball New Zealand announced that the ANZ Championship would be discontinued after the 2016 season. In Australia it was replaced by Suncorp Super Netball.  The founding members of Suncorp Super Netball included the five former Australian ANZ Championship teams – Adelaide Thunderbirds, Melbourne Vixens, New South Wales Swifts, Queensland Firebirds and West Coast Fever; plus three brand new franchises: Collingwood Magpies, Giants Netball and Sunshine Coast Lightning.

In August 2016, Sunshine Coast Lightning was officially launched. The team was formed as a joint venture by Melbourne Storm and the University of the Sunshine Coast with the support of Sunshine Coast Council. The colours of the team - navy blue, purple and yellow - are the same as the Storm's. The logo features a bolt of lightning.

Noeline Taurua era
 
Before the official launch of Sunshine Coast Lightning, Noeline Taurua had already been announced as the inaugural head coach of the new franchise.  In September 2016, Caitlin Bassett and Stephanie Wood became the first two Lightning players. Geva Mentor also subsequently signed for Lightning. In February 2017, Mentor was named captain of the new franchise. In 2017, Lightning finished the season as inaugural champions after defeating Giants Netball 65–48 in the grand final. In 2018 they retained the title after defeating West Coast Fever 62–59  in the grand final. In 2019, Lightning finished the regular season as minor premiers.  They also played in their third successive grand final but this time, they were defeated by New South Wales Swifts. After three seasons as head coach at Lightning, Taurua resigned and was replaced by her assistant at the club, Kylee Byrne.

Regular season statistics

Grand finals

Home venues
Lightning play the majority of their home matches at USC Stadium.  They have also occasionally played home matches at the Brisbane Entertainment Centre.

Notable players

2023 squad

Internationals

 Kate Shimmin
 Tara Hinchliffe

 Geva Mentor
 Kate Shimmin

 Kadie-Ann Dehaney

 Laura Langman
 Erena Mikaere

 Phumza Maweni 
 Karla Pretorius

 Peace Proscovia

Captains

Award winners

Suncorp Super Netball

Lightning awards

Shooting statistics

Head coaches

Reserve teams
Territory Storm
Between 2017 and 2019 Sunshine Coast Lightning formed a partnership with Territory Storm of the Australian Netball League. Storm were effectively Lightning's reserve team. In 2019, with a team featuring Lightning players Cara Koenen, Annika Lee-Jones, Peace Proscovia, and Jacqui Russell, Storm enjoyed one of their best seasons in the ANL, winning six matches and finishing fifth.

USC Thunder
Since 2019, USC Thunder have played in the HART Sapphire Series. They were formed as a partnership between Sunshine Coast Lightning and the University of the Sunshine Coast. They play home games at the USC Stadium.

Capital Darters
In 2019 it was announced that Sunshine Coast Lightning had formed a partnership with Capital Darters. Darters were due to play in the 2020 Australian Netball League season. However the season was cancelled due to the COVID-19 pandemic.

Australian Netball Championships
In September 2021, Sunshine Coast Lightning were due to enter a reserve team in the inaugural Australian Netball Championships tournament. However, this tournament was cancelled due to the COVID-19 pandemic. Lightning's ANC team subsequently played in a four team series, playing against Queensland Sapphires, the Queensland Suns men's netball team and  PacificAus Sports, a Pacific Islander select.

Premierships

Suncorp Super Netball
Winners: 2017, 2018
Runners Up: 2019
Minor Premierships: 2019

References

External links
 Official website

 
Suncorp Super Netball teams
Netball teams in Australia
Netball teams in Queensland
Melbourne Storm
University of the Sunshine Coast
Sport in the Sunshine Coast, Queensland
Sports clubs established in 2016
2016 establishments in Australia